Östanå is a village situated in Östra Göinge Municipality, Scania County, Sweden with 221 inhabitants in 2005.

References 

Populated places in Östra Göinge Municipality
Populated places in Skåne County